Gabrielle Louis-Carabin (born February 20, 1946 in Le Moule, Guadeloupe) was a member of the National Assembly of France, representing Guadeloupe's 2nd constituency from 2002 to 2017  as a member of the Union for a Popular Movement.

References
page on the French National Assembly website yes

'

1946 births
Living people
People from Le Moule
Guadeloupean politicians
Guadeloupean women in politics
Union for a Popular Movement politicians
Deputies of the 12th National Assembly of the French Fifth Republic
Deputies of the 13th National Assembly of the French Fifth Republic
Deputies of the 14th National Assembly of the French Fifth Republic
Women members of the National Assembly (France)
21st-century French women politicians

Black French politicians